Rajkumar Kanojia (born 11 June 1972) is an Indian Bollywood Actor from Hardoi district of Uttar Pradesh, India.

Rajkumar is known for his comedic roles in numerous regional and international movies. He has also starred in many commercials and TV serials. He was awarded Best Maharashtra State Level – Best Actor Award in 1996-1997. In Bollywood he has worked in many films, including Paisa Vasool, Besharam, Dabangg 2, Bhabhipedia, Style, Oh My Friend Ganesha and many more.

Rajkumar has also appeared in 6 international films, and has acted in many renowned TV serials such as Balika Vadhu and Phulwa.

Rajkumar's upcoming movies are Bhabipedia, Brunei and Flame.

Life and background

Rajkumar Kanojia is an Indian Film and Television actor from Hardoi, Uttar Pradesh, India. Kanojia was born on 11 June 1972 to Lata and Rambharose Kanojia. Shortly after his birth, the family moved to Mumbai and continues to live there. Rajkumar Kanojia completed his study from Tolani college of commerce (Mumbai, Maharashtra).

Rajkumar's mother (Lata Kanojia) is a housewife and his father worked in Qatar for 22 years. His wife (Rajeshree Kanojia) is an agent in Life Insurance Corporation of India (LIC). Rajkumar and Rajeshree have a 7-year-old son named Medhansh.

Filmography
 Dil Pe Mat Le Yaar
 Style
 Rules - Pyaar Ka Superhit Formula
 Haasil
 Chupke Se
 Dhoop
 Paisa Vasool
 99.9 FM
 Ho Sakta Hai
 Pyare Mohan
 Ram Gopal Varma Ki Aag
 One Two Three
 Apartment
 The Film Emotional Atyachar
 Paiyaa
 Masti Express
 Shakal Pe Mat Ja
 Besharam
 Yeh Ishq Sarfira
 Faactory

External links

References

Male actors in Hindi cinema
Living people
1972 births
People from Hardoi
Male actors from Uttar Pradesh